The 2000–01 Maltese First Division (known as the Rothmans First Division for sponsorship reasons) started on 9 September 2000 and finished on 29 April 2001. Gozo and Żurrieq were the relegated teams from the 1999–2000 Maltese Premier League. Marsaxlokk and Qormi were the promoted teams from the Maltese Second Division. Marsa finished as champions, by just one point, and were promoted to the 2001–02 Maltese Premier League alongside Lija Athletic, who finished runners-up. Tarxien Rainbows and Żurrieq were relegated to the 2001–02 Maltese Second Division. This was the second straight relegation for Żurrieq, having been relegated from the Premier League the previous season. Marsa suffered their only defeat at the hands of Żurrieq.

Participating teams
The Maltese First Division 2000–01 was made up of these teams:
 Gozo
 Lija Athletic
 Marsa
 Marsaxlokk
 Mosta
 Qormi
 St. Andrews
 St. Patrick
 Tarxien Rainbows
 Żurrieq

Changes from previous season
 Ħamrun Spartans and Xgħajra Tornados were promoted from the First Division to the Premier League. They were replaced with Gozo and Żurrieq, both relegated from 1999–2000 Maltese Premier League.
 Gżira United and Żebbuġ Rangers were relegated to the Second Division. They were replaced by Marsaxlokk, champions of 1999–2000 Second Division, and Qormi, runner up of 1999–2000 Second Division.

Final league table

Results
For a complete set of results, see 1.

Top scorers

References

Maltese First Division seasons
Malta
2

lt:Maltos pirmoji futbolo lyga